Fan Zhongzheng (c. 960 – c. 1030), courtesy name Zhongli, better known by his pseudonym Fan Kuan, was a Chinese landscape painter of the Song dynasty.

Travelers among Mountains and Streams, a large hanging scroll, is Fan Kuan's best known work and a seminal painting of the Northern Song school. It establishes an ideal in monumental landscape painting to which later painters were to return time and again for inspiration. The classic Chinese perspective of three planes is evident - near, middle (represented by water and mist), and far. Unlike earlier examples of Chinese landscape art, the grandeur of nature is the main theme, rather than merely providing a backdrop. A packhorse train can barely be seen emerging from a wood at the base of a towering precipice. The painting's style encompasses archaic conventions dating back to the Tang Dynasty.

The historian Patricia Ebrey explains her view on the painting that the:

...foreground, presented at eye level, is executed in crisp, well-defined brush strokes. Jutting boulders, tough scrub trees, a mule train on the road, and a temple in the forest on the cliff are all vividly depicted. There is a suitable break between the foreground and the towering central peak behind, which is treated as if it were a backdrop, suspended and fitted into a slot behind the foreground. There are human figures in this scene, but it is easy to imagine them overpowered by the magnitude and mystery of their surroundings.

Fan's masterpiece Travellers among Mountains and Streams bears a lost half-hidden signature rediscovered only in 1958.

See also
Culture of the Song Dynasty
Chinese Painting
Chinese art
History of Chinese art

Notes

References
Liu, Pingheng (1989). Shui mo yin yun, qi yun sheng dong de Zhongguo hui hua (水墨絪縕, 氣韻生動的中國繪畫) = Misty and Lively Chinese Painting. Taibei Shi: Guo li li shi bo wu guan.
Ebrey, Patricia Buckley. The Cambridge Illustrated History of China. Cambridge: Cambridge University Press, 1999.

External links

Painting Gallery of Fan Kuan at China Online Museum
Other paintings by Fan Kuan at the Museum of Fine Arts, Boston
Fan Kuan, A Bilingual Study of His Life & Works (English & Chinese)
Landscapes Clear and Radiant: The Art of Wang Hui (1632-1717), an exhibition catalog from The Metropolitan Museum of Art (fully available online as PDF), which contains material on Fan Kuan (see index)

Year of birth unknown
Date of death unknown
Song dynasty landscape painters
People from Tongchuan
Painters from Shaanxi
10th-century Chinese painters
11th-century Chinese painters
Year of birth uncertain